Robert Mugabe (1924–2019) was the second president of Zimbabwe.

Mugabe may also refer to:
Omugabe or the Mugabe, a title given to kings of Ankole of Uganda

People with the surname
Aristide Mugabe (born 1988), Rwandan basketball player
Grace Mugabe (born 1965), second wife of Robert Mugabe
Sally Mugabe (1931–1992), first wife of Robert Mugabe

People with the given name
Mugabe Were (1968–2008), Kenyan politician